Jazz at Cal-Tech is an album by saxophonist Bud Shank recorded in January 1956 for the Pacific Jazz label.

Reception

AllMusic's review by Jason Ankeney states: "The near-telepathic interplay that distinguishes all of Bud Shank's collaborations with reedist Bob Cooper reaches a dazzling peak with the live Jazz at Cal-Tech. A deceptively freewheeling set... it boasts a simmering intensity often missing from Shank and Cooper's subsequent studio sessions, channeling the energy of the audience to add a new edge to their creative give and take".

Track listing
 "When Lights are Low" (Benny Carter, Spencer Williams) – 7:30
 "Old Devil Moon" (Burton Lane, Yip Harburg) - 6:38
 "The Nearness of You" (Hoagy Carmichael, Ned Washington) - 4:07
 "How Long Has This Been Going On?" (George Gershwin, Ira Gershwin) - 4:50
 "Tea for Two" (Vincent Youmans, Irving Caesar) - 4:50
 "Lullaby of Birdland" (George Shearing, George David Weiss) - 4:03
 "Somebody Loves Me" (George Gershwin, Ballard MacDonald, Buddy DeSylva) - 5:38
 "Moonlight in Vermont" (Karl Suessdorf, John Blackburn) - 6:20
 "The King" (Count Basie) - 6:09

Personnel 
Bud Shank - alto saxophone, flute
Bob Cooper - tenor saxophone, oboe 
Claude Williamson - piano
Don Prell - bass
Chuck Flores - drums

References 

1956 live albums
Pacific Jazz Records live albums
Bud Shank live albums